Blow up, Blow-up or Blowup may refer to:

 Explosion
 Total body disruption, a cause of death typically associated with explosion
 An inflatable
 Blowup, a 1966 film by Michelangelo Antonioni
 Blow-up and Other Stories, a short story collection by Julio Cortázar
 Blow Up (magazine), an Italy-based music magazine

Music 
 Blow Up (band), a British indie band
 Blow Up (club), a nightclub in Munich, established in 1967
 Blow Up (club night), a club night in London, established in 1993 
 Blow-Up (DJ duo), an American DJ duo
 Blow Up (Bobby Hutcherson album), 1969
 Blow Up (The Smithereens album), 1991
 Blow-Up (soundtrack), an album by Herbie Hancock, featuring music composed for the 1966 film
 Blow Up (EP), a 2004 EP by The Presets
 Blow Up, an album by Bomba Estéreo
 Blow Up Records, a UK record label
 Blow Up, a song by Devo from the album "Total Devo"
 Blow Up, a song by Sammy Adams

See also 
 Blowing up, a mathematical operation
 Enlarger
 Image scaling
 Blow Out, a 1981 film by Brian De Palma